Akebono (known as EXOS-D before launch) is a satellite to study aurora and Earth's magnetosphere environment.
It was developed by Institute of Space and Astronautical Science and launched by M-3SII rocket on February 22, 1989.

After 26 years of successful observation, operation was terminated on April 23, 2015, due to the degradation of solar cells and the decay of orbit.

See also

International Solar-Terrestrial Physics Science Initiative

Notes

External links
 https://web.archive.org/web/20061023123528/http://www.isas.jaxa.jp/e/enterp/missions/akebono/

Earth observation satellites of Japan
Spacecraft launched in 1989
Derelict satellites orbiting Earth